

Cabinet

Sources

Government of South Africa
Executive branch of the government of South Africa
Cabinets of South Africa
1958 establishments in South Africa
1961 disestablishments in South Africa
Cabinets established in 1958
Cabinets disestablished in 1961